Philipotabanus is a genus of horse fly belonging to the family Tabanidae subfamily Tabaninae.

Species
Philipotabanus annectans Fairchild, 1975
Philipotabanus caliginosus (Bellardi, 1859)
Philipotabanus chrysothrix (Fairchild, 1943)
Philipotabanus criton (Kröber, 1934)
Philipotabanus ebrius (Osten Sacken, 1886)
Philipotabanus ecuadoriensis (Kröber, 1930)
Philipotabanus elviae (Fairchild, 1943)
Philipotabanus engimus Philip, 1954
Philipotabanus fascipennis (Macquart, 1846)
Philipotabanus fucosus Fairchild, 1958
Philipotabanus inauratus (Fairchild, 1947)
Philipotabanus keenani (Fairchild, 1947)
Philipotabanus kompi (Fairchild, 1943)
Philipotabanus magnificus (Kröber, 1934)
Philipotabanus medius (Kröber, 1934)
Philipotabanus nigrinubilus (Fairchild, 1953)
Philipotabanus nigripennis Wilkerson, 1979
Philipotabanus obidensis Henriques, 2006
Philipotabanus opimus Fairchild, 1975
Philipotabanus pallidetinctus (Kröber, 1930)
Philipotabanus phalaropygus Fairchild, 1964
Philipotabanus pictus Gorayeb & Rafael, 1984
Philipotabanus plenus (Hine, 1907)
Philipotabanus porteri Fairchild, 1975
Philipotabanus pterographicus (Fairchild, 1943)
Philipotabanus reticulatus (Kröber, 1930)
Philipotabanus stigmaticalis (Kröber, 1931)
Philipotabanus tanypterus Wilkerson, 1979
Philipotabanus tenuifasciatus (Kröber, 1930)
Philipotabanus unimaculus (Kröber, 1934)
Philipotabanus vulpinus Fairchild, 1975

References

Tabanidae
Diptera of North America
Diptera of South America
Tabanoidea genera
Taxa named by Graham Fairchild